Nieuwerkerke (also: Nieuwerkerke Schutje) is a hamlet in the Dutch province of Zeeland. It is a part of the municipality of Schouwen-Duiveland, and lies about 3 km southwest of Brouwershaven.

Nieuwerkerke is not a statistical entity, and the postal authorities have placed it under Kerkwerve. It was home to 140 people in 1840. Nowadays, it consists of a handful of houses. It used to have a church, but it was destroyed in 1576 by Spanish troops and never rebuilt.

Nieuwerkerke was a separate municipality until 1813, when it was merged with Kerkwerve. 

Nieuwerkerke should not be confused with Nieuwerkerk, a larger village on the same island.

References

Schouwen-Duiveland
History of Schouwen-Duiveland
Populated places in Zeeland
Former municipalities of Zeeland